Qiandaohu railway station is a railway station in Chun'an County, Hangzhou, Zhejiang, China. It opened on 25 December 2018 along with the Hangzhou–Huangshan intercity railway. It is located directly adjacent to Qiandao Lake. During construction, the name of this station was Chun'an, however this was changed to Qiandaohu in July 2018.

References 

Railway stations in Zhejiang
Railway stations in China opened in 2018